Jatun Q'asa (Quechua jatun, hatun big, q'asa mountain pass, "big pass", also spelled Jatun Khasa) is a  mountain in the Bolivian Andes. It is located in the Chuquisaca Department, Azurduy Province, Tarvita Municipality. Llaqta Punta is the neighboring peak to the northwest.

References 

Mountains of Chuquisaca Department